John Arthur Langley (June 25, 1896 – March 5, 1967) was an American ice hockey player who competed in the 1924 Winter Olympics.

Born in Melrose, Massachusetts, he was a member of the American ice hockey team, which won the silver medal. He died in Eustis, Florida.

External links
Art Langley @ Hockey-Reference.com

1896 births
1967 deaths
American men's ice hockey goaltenders
Ice hockey players from Massachusetts
Ice hockey players at the 1924 Winter Olympics
Medalists at the 1924 Winter Olympics
New Haven Bears players
Olympic silver medalists for the United States in ice hockey
People from Melrose, Massachusetts
Sportspeople from Middlesex County, Massachusetts